The Mahd Al Thahab ("Cradle of (the) Gold"), is a small gold area in the Arabian Peninsula.  It is located in the Province of Al-Madinah, in the Hejazi region of Saudi Arabia.

Gold was first mined in Arabia c. 3,000 BC.  A second period of activity was during the Islamic Abbasid period between 750 and 1258 AD.  The latest activities by Saudi Arabian Mining Syndicate began in 1936 using both open-pit and underground mines at Mahd Al Thahab. The Saudi Arabian Directorate General of Mineral Resources carried out further gold exploration in the 1970s, following the 1971 suspension of the US$-gold exchange rate and the consequent rise in value of the metal. Gold mining is done today by the Saudi Arabian Mining Company. The mine will close on 2023 as now only low grade gold is being mined because of the depleting resources.

Antiquity 
There is a possibility that the Cradle of Gold is mentioned in the Biblical story of the Garden of Eden in The Book of Genesis.  - "And a river went out of Eden to water the garden; and from thence it was parted, and became into four heads. The name of the first is Pishon: that is it which compasseth the whole land of Havilah, where there is gold; And the gold of that land is good: there is bdellium and the onyx stone."  Research by archaeologists Juris Zarins of Missouri State University and Farouk El-Baz of Boston University indicates that the Pishon River may be the now dried up river bed that once flowed 600 miles north east from the Mahd Al Thahab area of the Hejaz c. 3000 BC.

The site has also been identified with "King Solomon's Gold Mine." Geologists have found a vast abandoned gold mine. Among their finds are huge quantities of waste rock, an estimated million tons, left by the ancient miners, still containing traces of gold. Thousands of stone hammers and grindstones used to extract the gold from the ore litter the mine slopes. Robert W. Luce said: "Our investigations have now confirmed that the old mine could have been as rich as described in biblical accounts."

References 
 

Populated places in Medina Province (Saudi Arabia)
Gold mining
Governorates of Saudi Arabia